KHND (1470 AM) is a radio station licensed to serve Harvey, North Dakota.  The station is owned by Three Way Broadcasting, Inc. It airs an adult contemporary music format.

The station was assigned the KHND call letters by the Federal Communications Commission.

References

External links

HND
Mainstream adult contemporary radio stations in the United States
Wells County, North Dakota